The 1974–75 New York Rangers season was the franchise's 49th season. A league realignment had the Rangers moved into the new Patrick Division within the Campbell Conference, where the team finished 2nd with 88 points. They qualified for the playoffs, losing in the preliminary round to the New York Islanders 2–1 in a best of three games series.

Regular season

Final standings

Schedule and results

|- align="center" bgcolor="#CCFFCC"
| 1 || 9 || Washington Capitals || 6–3 || 1–0–0
|- align="center" bgcolor="#FFBBBB"
| 2 || 12 || @ Toronto Maple Leafs || 7–3 || 1–1–0
|- align="center" bgcolor="white"
| 3 || 16 || California Golden Seals || 5–5 || 1–1–1
|- align="center" bgcolor="#CCFFCC"
| 4 || 19 || @ New York Islanders || 4–2 || 2–1–1
|- align="center" bgcolor="#FFBBBB"
| 5 || 20 || Vancouver Canucks || 1–0 || 2–2–1
|- align="center" bgcolor="#CCFFCC"
| 6 || 23 || St. Louis Blues || 5–1 || 3–2–1
|- align="center" bgcolor="#CCFFCC"
| 7 || 26 || @ Pittsburgh Penguins || 5–4 || 4–2–1
|- align="center" bgcolor="#CCFFCC"
| 8 || 27 || Atlanta Flames || 4–1 || 5–2–1
|- align="center" bgcolor="white"
| 9 || 30 || New York Islanders || 1–1 || 5–2–2
|- align="center" bgcolor="#FFBBBB"
| 10 || 31 || @ Philadelphia Flyers || 5–1 || 5–3–2
|-

|- align="center" bgcolor="#FFBBBB"
| 11 || 3 || Buffalo Sabres || 4–3 || 5–4–2
|- align="center" bgcolor="#FFBBBB"
| 12 || 5 || @ Vancouver Canucks || 2–1 || 5–5–2
|- align="center" bgcolor="#CCFFCC"
| 13 || 6 || @ California Golden Seals || 7–3 || 6–5–2
|- align="center" bgcolor="white"
| 14 || 9 || @ Los Angeles Kings || 2–2 || 6–5–3
|- align="center" bgcolor="#FFBBBB"
| 15 || 13 || Philadelphia Flyers || 3–2 || 6–6–3
|- align="center" bgcolor="white"
| 16 || 16 || @ Montreal Canadiens || 4–4 || 6–6–4
|- align="center" bgcolor="#CCFFCC"
| 17 || 17 || California Golden Seals || 10–0 || 7–6–4
|- align="center" bgcolor="#CCFFCC"
| 18 || 20 || @ Detroit Red Wings || 5–4 || 8–6–4
|- align="center" bgcolor="#FFBBBB"
| 19 || 23 || Boston Bruins || 5–2 || 8–7–4
|- align="center" bgcolor="#CCFFCC"
| 20 || 24 || Pittsburgh Penguins || 7–5 || 9–7–4
|- align="center" bgcolor="#CCFFCC"
| 21 || 27 || Toronto Maple Leafs || 4–1 || 10–7–4
|- align="center" bgcolor="#FFBBBB"
| 22 || 29 || @ Atlanta Flames || 3–2 || 10–8–4
|-

|- align="center" bgcolor="white"
| 23 || 1 || St. Louis Blues || 4–4 || 10–8–5
|- align="center" bgcolor="#CCFFCC"
| 24 || 4 || Detroit Red Wings || 4–2 || 11–8–5
|- align="center" bgcolor="#CCFFCC"
| 25 || 7 || @ Chicago Black Hawks || 7–4 || 12–8–5
|- align="center" bgcolor="white"
| 26 || 8 || Montreal Canadiens || 3–3 || 12–8–6
|- align="center" bgcolor="white"
| 27 || 12 || @ Washington Capitals || 6–6 || 12–8–7
|- align="center" bgcolor="#FFBBBB"
| 28 || 14 || @ St. Louis Blues || 6–2 || 12–9–7
|- align="center" bgcolor="white"
| 29 || 15 || Los Angeles Kings || 3–3 || 12–9–8
|- align="center" bgcolor="#CCFFCC"
| 30 || 18 || Minnesota North Stars || 7–0 || 13–9–8
|- align="center" bgcolor="#FFBBBB"
| 31 || 19 || @ Boston Bruins || 11–3 || 13–10–8
|- align="center" bgcolor="#FFBBBB"
| 32 || 22 || Atlanta Flames || 4–3 || 13–11–8
|- align="center" bgcolor="#CCFFCC"
| 33 || 27 || Buffalo Sabres || 9–5 || 14–11–8
|- align="center" bgcolor="#CCFFCC"
| 34 || 29 || Kansas City Scouts || 2–1 || 15–11–8
|- align="center" bgcolor="#CCFFCC"
| 35 || 30 || @ Minnesota North Stars || 8–1 || 16–11–8
|-

|- align="center" bgcolor="#CCFFCC"
| 36 || 1 || Chicago Black Hawks || 6–2 || 17–11–8
|- align="center" bgcolor="#CCFFCC"
| 37 || 4 || @ New York Islanders || 5–3 || 18–11–8
|- align="center" bgcolor="#CCFFCC"
| 38 || 5 || Vancouver Canucks || 6–2 || 19–11–8
|- align="center" bgcolor="#CCFFCC"
| 39 || 8 || @ Kansas City Scouts || 6–1 || 20–11–8
|- align="center" bgcolor="#CCFFCC"
| 40 || 11 || @ St. Louis Blues || 5–3 || 21–11–8
|- align="center" bgcolor="#FFBBBB"
| 41 || 12 || @ Chicago Black Hawks || 4–2 || 21–12–8
|- align="center" bgcolor="#CCFFCC"
| 42 || 15 || @ Minnesota North Stars || 5–3 || 22–12–8
|- align="center" bgcolor="white"
| 43 || 17 || @ California Golden Seals || 4–4 || 22–12–9
|- align="center" bgcolor="#CCFFCC"
| 44 || 18 || @ Vancouver Canucks || 3–2 || 23–12–9
|- align="center" bgcolor="#CCFFCC"
| 45 || 23 || Atlanta Flames || 5–2 || 24–12–9
|- align="center" bgcolor="#FFBBBB"
| 46 || 25 || @ Pittsburgh Penguins || 5–2 || 24–13–9
|- align="center" bgcolor="#CCFFCC"
| 47 || 26 || Los Angeles Kings || 3–2 || 25–13–9
|- align="center" bgcolor="#FFBBBB"
| 48 || 28 || @ Los Angeles Kings || 5–2 || 25–14–9
|- align="center" bgcolor="#FFBBBB"
| 49 || 30 || @ Buffalo Sabres || 6–3 || 25–15–9
|-

|- align="center" bgcolor="#CCFFCC"
| 50 || 1 || @ Chicago Black Hawks || 4–1 || 26–15–9
|- align="center" bgcolor="white"
| 51 || 2 || Detroit Red Wings || 5–5 || 26–15–10
|- align="center" bgcolor="#FFBBBB"
| 52 || 5 || Philadelphia Flyers || 4–3 || 26–16–10
|- align="center" bgcolor="#CCFFCC"
| 53 || 6 || @ Philadelphia Flyers || 3–1 || 27–16–10
|- align="center" bgcolor="#FFBBBB"
| 54 || 8 || @ Montreal Canadiens || 7–1 || 27–17–10
|- align="center" bgcolor="#CCFFCC"
| 55 || 9 || Washington Capitals || 7–3 || 28–17–10
|- align="center" bgcolor="#FFBBBB"
| 56 || 11 || @ Washington Capitals || 7–4 || 28–18–10
|- align="center" bgcolor="#CCFFCC"
| 57 || 15 || @ Minnesota North Stars || 9–2 || 29–18–10
|- align="center" bgcolor="white"
| 58 || 16 || Toronto Maple Leafs || 5–5 || 29–18–11
|- align="center" bgcolor="white"
| 59 || 18 || @ Kansas City Scouts || 2–2 || 29–18–12
|- align="center" bgcolor="white"
| 60 || 19 || Chicago Black Hawks || 2–2 || 29–18–13
|- align="center" bgcolor="#FFBBBB"
| 61 || 22 || @ Toronto Maple Leafs || 5–2 || 29–19–13
|- align="center" bgcolor="#CCFFCC"
| 62 || 23 || Philadelphia Flyers || 2–1 || 30–19–13
|- align="center" bgcolor="#CCFFCC"
| 63 || 26 || St. Louis Blues || 5–1 || 31–19–13
|-

|- align="center" bgcolor="#FFBBBB"
| 64 || 2 || Pittsburgh Penguins || 8–6 || 31–20–13
|- align="center" bgcolor="#FFBBBB"
| 65 || 5 || Buffalo Sabres || 6–3 || 31–21–13
|- align="center" bgcolor="#CCFFCC"
| 66 || 7 || @ Kansas City Scouts || 5–2 || 32–21–13
|- align="center" bgcolor="#FFBBBB"
| 67 || 9 || Montreal Canadiens || 5–3 || 32–22–13
|- align="center" bgcolor="#FFBBBB"
| 68 || 11 || @ Boston Bruins || 6–3 || 32–23–13
|- align="center" bgcolor="#CCFFCC"
| 69 || 12 || New York Islanders || 5–3 || 33–23–13
|- align="center" bgcolor="#FFBBBB"
| 70 || 14 || @ Atlanta Flames || 1–0 || 33–24–13
|- align="center" bgcolor="#CCFFCC"
| 71 || 19 || Vancouver Canucks || 3–0 || 34–24–13
|- align="center" bgcolor="#FFBBBB"
| 72 || 20 || @ Buffalo Sabres || 6–3 || 34–25–13
|- align="center" bgcolor="#FFBBBB"
| 73 || 22 || @ Detroit Red Wings || 7–4 || 34–26–13
|- align="center" bgcolor="#CCFFCC"
| 74 || 23 || Boston Bruins || 7–5 || 35–26–13
|- align="center" bgcolor="#FFBBBB"
| 75 || 26 || Minnesota North Stars || 4–2 || 35–27–13
|- align="center" bgcolor="#FFBBBB"
| 76 || 29 || @ New York Islanders || 6–4 || 35–28–13
|- align="center" bgcolor="#CCFFCC"
| 77 || 30 || Kansas City Scouts || 8–2 || 36–28–13
|-

|- align="center" bgcolor="white"
| 78 || 3 || @ Philadelphia Flyers || 1–1 || 36–28–14
|- align="center" bgcolor="#CCFFCC"
| 79 || 4 || @ Atlanta Flames || 3–2 || 37–28–14
|- align="center" bgcolor="#FFBBBB"
| 80 || 6 || New York Islanders || 6–4 || 37–29–14
|-

Playoffs

Key:  Win  Loss

Player statistics
Skaters

Goaltenders

†Denotes player spent time with another team before joining Rangers. Stats reflect time with Rangers only.
‡Traded mid-season. Stats reflect time with Rangers only.

Awards and records

Transactions

Draft picks
New York's picks at the 1974 NHL amateur draft in Montreal, Quebec, Canada.

Farm teams

See also
 1974–75 NHL season

References

External links
 

New York Rangers seasons
New York Rangers
New York Rangers
New York Rangers
New York Rangers
Madison Square Garden
1970s in Manhattan